Herbert Karl Johannes Seifert (27 May 1897, Bernstadt – 1 October 1996, Heidelberg) was a German mathematician known for his work in topology.

Biography
Seifert was born in Bernstadt auf dem Eigen, but soon moved to Bautzen, where he attended primary school at the Knabenbürgerschule, and secondary school at the Oberrealschule.  

In 1926 Seifert entered the Dresden University of Technology.  The next year he attended a course on topology given by William Threlfall.  This would be the beginning both of his lifelong work in the subject and his friendship with Threlfall.  In the year 1928–29 he visited the University of Göttingen, where topologists such as Pavel Sergeevich Alexandrov and Heinz Hopf were working.  

In 1930 he received his doctorate with his work on three-dimensional closed manifolds (which contains the Seifert–van Kampen theorem).  He then moved to the University of Leipzig, where he received his second doctorate in 1932. It was here that Seifert submitted his dissertation, Topologie 3-dimensionaler gefaserter Räume (“Topology of 3-dimensional fibred spaces”), on 1 February 1932, and he was awarded with this doctorate of philosophy after his oral examination on March 3. The manifolds he studied in his thesis were afterwards named Seifert fiber spaces.

Seifert continued to collaborate with Threlfall, and in 1934 (the year Seifert received his habilitation) they published their Lehrbuch der Topologie.  In 1938 they published Variationsrechnung im Grossen.

In 1935, Seifert was  summoned to a post at the University of Heidelberg, where he took a position vacated by the dismissal of a Jewish professor.  During World War II he volunteered for a position at a Luftwaffe research center, the Institut für Gasdynamik.  After the war, Seifert was one of the few German professors whom the Allies trusted during the period of denazification.

In the year 1948–49 Seifert visited the Institute for Advanced Study in Princeton, New Jersey. On 13 September 1949, soon after returning to Germany, he married Katharina Korn.  

Seifert retired in 1975. His students include Albrecht Dold, Dieter Puppe, and Horst Schubert.

See also

Seifert surface
Seifert–van Kampen theorem
Seifert conjecture
Seifert–Weber space

References

External links

1907 births
1996 deaths
People from Görlitz (district)
People from the Kingdom of Saxony
20th-century German mathematicians
Topologists
TU Dresden alumni
German textbook writers